The 2020–21 season was the first season of Benevento back in the top-flight of Italian football following promotion from Serie B. It was also only be the club's second ever season in Serie A. In addition to the domestic league, Benevento participated in this season's edition of the Coppa Italia. The season covered the period from 7 August 2020 to 30 June 2021.

Players

Squad information
Players and squad numbers last updated on 20 August 2020. Appearances include league matches only.Note: Flags indicate national team as has been defined under FIFA eligibility rules. Players may hold more than one non-FIFA nationality.

Transfers

In

Pre-season and friendlies
Benevento began their pre-season on August 17 in Seefeld in Tirol, Austria.  Filippo Inzaghi announced a squad of 30 players would take part in the training camp.

Competitions

Overview

Serie A

League table

Results summary

Results by round

Matches
The league fixtures were announced on 2 September 2020.

Coppa Italia

Statistics

Goalscorers

Clean sheets

References

Benevento Calcio seasons
Benevento